Mary L. Padula is a former politician who represented the Second Worcester and Middlesex District in the Massachusetts Senate from 1983 to 1991 and served as Massachusetts' Secretary of Housing & Community Development from 1991 until the post was eliminated in 1996.

Prior to serving the Senate, Padula was the executive secretary for the town of Lunenburg, Massachusetts from 1953 to 1983.

See also
 List of former districts of the Massachusetts Senate

References

Living people
Republican Party Massachusetts state senators
People from Lunenburg, Massachusetts
State cabinet secretaries of Massachusetts
Women state legislators in Massachusetts
Year of birth missing (living people)